Chris Culver is the pen name of an American author of crime fiction and thrillers.  His books are set in and around the Midwestern United States. He is well known for his works featuring IMPD Detective Ashraf (Ash) Rashid. His debut novel, The Abbey, was on The New York Times bestseller list for 16 weeks. He has since gone on to write several stand alone books and is currently working on a new series set in St. Louis.

Background
Chris Culver was born in Tulsa, Oklahoma and moved to Chickasha, Oklahoma shortly thereafter. He and his family moved to Newburgh, Indiana when he was seven years old.

Chris Culver read a lot as a child in elementary school. His favorite authors at that time were J. R. R. Tolkien and Stephen King. His love of books extended to the classroom where he even sneaked extra books beneath his desk and read during class.   In fifth grade, he did a book report on Michael Crichton’s The Andromeda Strain since the assignment was to read something scary and report what made it so. While his fellow classmates chose to write about ghosts and things that go bump in the night, he wrote about the horrors of biological warfare.

He first became interested in writing crime fiction after picking up a dog-eared, coffee-stained paperback copy of Mickey Spillane's I, the Jury in a library book sale.

Chris Culver completed his undergraduate studies at a private liberal arts college in southern Indiana. There he majored in philosophy and met his future wife.  Afterwards, he attended law school.  He then enrolled in a PhD program in philosophy at Purdue, but left before completing his full degree when his wife was offered a faculty position in Arkansas.

After graduate school, Chris Culver taught classes in ethics, the philosophy of religion, and religious studies at a small university in Arkansas. It was during this time that he wrote his first Ash Rashid novel. He credits his inspiration for the character creation to his students and their hardships.  About Ash Rashid, he writes, "In a lot of ways, he's my idea of a hero. He doesn't have special powers or abilities, but he tries his best to do what's right. People occasionally ask me if he's based on a real person. He's not, but I hope there are people like him out there. The world needs people like that." He chose to write Ash Rashid as a Muslim detective partly to add depth to his background and make him seem more human and partly because he was "tired of reading books and seeing movies that portray all Muslims as terrorists of zealots."

He currently lives near St. Louis, MO with his family.

Career
The Abbey was the fourth novel Chris Culver wrote, but the first he considered good enough to publish.  He wrote ten query letters to literary agents.  They either did not have interest in the book, didn't respond, or were unsure of its potential on the market.  He then decided to self-publish The Abbey in February 2011.  He was pleased and surprised that he sold so well on his own. As of early 2013, his e-book sales totaled more than 750,000 copies. The early success attracted the attention of a literary agent and publisher, Hachette Book Group with whom he sold three Ash Rashid series books.

He published two books, Just Run and Nine Years Gone without a publisher in 2011 and 2014, respectively.  In December 2014, Chris Culver announced on Facebook that Hachette is no longer publishing the Ash Rashid series.  However, he continued to publish the series on his own.

Interviews
 November 15, 2012: Crime Fiction Lover
 February 18, 2012: Katheryn Lane 
 May 8, 2013: A Closer Look (Radio)
 July 14, 2014: Crime Thriller Girl
 July 14, 2014: Omnimystery News
 July 31, 2014: The Reading Frenzy
 May 28, 2015: Crime Thriller Girl

Works

Series
Ash Rashid Series - The novels in the popular Ash Rashid series follow the career of a former homicide detective, who now works for the prosecutor's office. Detective Ashraf Rashid tries his best to do what is right, but often acts unscrupulously in the pursuit of justice. Though he is a practicing Muslim, he is an alcoholic. He justifies drinking as a necessary way to cope with what he has seen on the job. As the series progresses, he focuses more on his family and working on his problems.
Gabe Ward Series - Detective Gabriel Ward is a former Army intelligence officer with degrees in computer science and physics. As his department's computer crimes expert, he uses computer forensics to solve crimes as much as his street sense. The first book in the series starts with a personal matter when Detective Ward must identify the remains of his brother-in-law at a crime scene.
Joe Court Series - From Chris's website; The Girl in the Motel: "Detective Mary Joe Court sleeps with a shotgun beside her bed and a loveable bullmastiff at her feet. For the past twelve years, she’s hidden from a nightmarish past, but with every passing day, her scars fade, and her heart grows lighter. Now, for the first time in her life, she looks forward to her future. She’s happy. Then she finds the body. Someone shot the victim in her chest and left her to die in a cheap motel. Joe knew her well. She grew up with her. They were sisters, of a sort. Twelve years ago, the victim put a gangster in prison. Now that gangster’s out, and he’s looking to settle scores—Joe included. Joe has fought to leave her past behind. Now, she has to face it or lose everything she cares about. Because the killer hunting her will tear apart her carefully constructed life piece by piece until there’s nothing left. Unless Joe gets him first."
Hannah Blackwood Series - From Chris Culver's website: Hana Blackwood is a woman without an identity. Once, she was a combat medic in the US Army. Now she’s a civilian. Then she was a decorated detective with the St. Louis county police department. Now, she’s not. She had a family once, but she lost them to a civil war most of the world has forgotten. She’s adrift. Then she meets the Romero family. Someone murdered their son three years ago. The police never even found a suspect. Hana doesn’t know the victim or his family, but she understands loss. She can’t bring the victim back, but maybe she can help a family understand their son’s death. Only, the victim was hardly innocent. And his killers haven’t gone far. As Hana investigates and draws closer to the truth, dangerous men draw closer to her. But Hana’s no damsel in distress. She’s smart, capable, and absolutely lethal. Unfortunately, so are the men she’s hunting.

Standalone Novels
Just Run - This standalone thriller follows mathematician Renee Carter and Detective Trent Schaefer from the Ohio Attorney General's office.  Renee Carter and a colleague uncover a corrupt online poker site, which makes them a target.  Detective Schaefer shows his knowledge to be more than that of the average detective and hints at a much deeper background. "The book’s ending, along with much of the storyline and character development, is quite unexpected and wholly satisfying."  Just Run was listed on the USA Best Selling Books in October, 2011.
Nine Years Gone - This standalone psychological thriller is set in St. Louis, Missouri. Crime novelist Steve Hale is haunted by a decision he made nine years ago to save his girlfriend from her abusive stepfather by framing him for murder. When his former girlfriend comes back to town after her stepfather is executed, Steve Hale realizes she could ruin the happy life he has created.  Her lies, demands, and psychopathic tendencies give the reader a memorable villain.

Novels

Readers Advisory
If you like Chris Culver, you might like these other authors as well.
 David Baldacci
 Lee Child
 Harlen Coben
 Michael Connelly
 Vince Flynn
 John Grisham
 James Patterson

References

External links
Chris Culver Amazon Author Page
Chris Culver's Official Website
Chris Culver's Facebook page
Chris Culver's Twitter page
Interview by Crime Fiction Lover

21st-century American male writers
21st-century American novelists
American male novelists
American crime fiction writers
American thriller writers
Hanover College alumni
Purdue University alumni
Novelists from Indiana
Novelists from Oklahoma
People from Chickasha, Oklahoma
People from Newburgh, Indiana
Writers from St. Louis
Novelists from Missouri